On 11 August 2017, a Sikorsky UH-60M Black Hawk helicopter operated by the United Arab Emirates Air Force crashed while on a Saudi-led mission in Shabwa, Yemen, killing four of the soldiers on board. According to the Emirates News Agency, the crash was due to a technical malfunction.

Seven soldiers survived the crash, including a member of the royal Al Nahyan family. Emirati officials asked for help rescuing the survivors from Major General Miguel Correa, then the defense attaché at the United States Embassy in Abu Dhabi, which resulted in sending American special forces on two Ospreys for a rescue mission. The American medical team flew the seven injured soldiers to the USS Bataan in Gulf of Aden. After 48 hours, they were sent to an airport in Yemen, where they boarded an Air Force C-17 cargo plane destined for Landstuhl Regional Medical Center, Germany.

References 

Aviation accidents and incidents in 2017
Accidents and incidents involving the Sikorsky UH-60 Black Hawk
Accidents and incidents involving helicopters
August 2017 events in Asia